Archeologia Medievale is a peer-reviewed academic journal of post-classical archaeology and the history of material culture in the pre-industrial age. The journal was founded by Riccardo Francovich. It is indexed in SCOPUS, International Bibliography or Art, Periodicals Index Online, and DIALNET.

References

Further reading

External links

Digitised copies of the journal

Archaeology journals
Italian-language journals
Annual journals
Publications established in 1974
Medieval studies